Michael Carroll Wooten (born October 23, 1962) is a former American football center in the National Football League (NFL) for the Washington Redskins.  He played college football at the Virginia Military Institute.

Early life
Wooten was born in Roanoke, Virginia.  His family moved to Smithfield, North Carolina in 1969 when his father, Carroll Wooten, was hired as an assistant principal and assistant football coach at Smithfield-Selma High School.  While attending Smithfield-Selma, Wooten participated in football, wrestling and track.  In football, he was an all-state and all-conference selection at tight end and defensive end, playing in the North-South All-Star Game after his senior season.  He graduated in 1981.

College career
Wooten attended and played college football at the Virginia Military Institute.  His senior year, he was selected as co-captain and received pre-season all-American honors. He graduated with a degree in economics before being commissioned as a Second lieutenant in the United States Army.

Professional career
Wooten played for the Washington Redskins in 1987 season.  The 1987 season began with a 24-day players' strike, reducing the 16-game season to 15.  The games for weeks 4–6 were won with all replacement players, including Wooten. The Redskins have the distinction of being the only team with no players crossing the picket line.  Those three victories are often credited with getting the team into the playoffs and the basis for the 2000 movie The Replacements.

NCAA Official
Wooten is now a football referee in the Atlantic Coast Conference at the position of umpire and he was selected to officiate the 2008 ACC Championship Game in Tampa, Florida.

Personal life
Wooten was named to the Johnston County Sports Hall of Fame in 2008.  He is married and has two children, Michael and Meredith. His son Michael is a red shirt Junior at Campbell University and plays tight end.

References

External links
 

1962 births
Living people
Sportspeople from Roanoke, Virginia
American football centers
VMI Keydets football players
Washington Redskins players
National Football League replacement players